The third election to the Greater London Council was held on 9 April 1970 and saw a Conservative victory with a reduced majority.

Electoral arrangements
New constituencies to be used for elections to Parliament and also for elections to the GLC had not yet been settled, so the London boroughs were used as multi-member 'first past the post' electoral areas . Westminster was joined with the City of London for this purpose. Each electoral area returned between 2 and 4 councillors.

Results
In addition to the 100 councillors, there were sixteen Aldermen who divided 11 Conservative and 5 Labour, so that the Conservatives actually had 76 seats to 40 for Labour following the election.

With an electorate of 5,524,384, there was a turnout of 35.2%. Labour recovered from its mauling three years previously, but did so primarily in working-class areas. Consequently, relatively few seats changed hands: Labour won back Camden, Greenwich, Hammersmith, Lewisham, Wandsworth, and one seat in Lambeth. The results did enable Labour to take back control of the Inner London Education Authority and were one of the factors used by Prime Minister Harold Wilson in deciding to call a general election soon after.

Among those who were first elected to the GLC in 1970 were Tony Banks (Labour, Hammersmith, later Minister for Sport) and Sir George Young (Conservative, Ealing, later a cabinet minister under John Major). The election is also significant as it was at a meeting in support of the Conservative candidates in Lambeth that John Major met Norma Johnson, who became his wife.

1 These parties were created by a group of students standing in Haringey, who declared that they intended to make a mockery of the election.

By-elections 1970–1973
No seats changed hands in byelections during this term. The Conservatives retained Kensington and Chelsea on 2 December 1971 after the death of Seton Forbes-Cockell, and Barnet on 19 October 1972 after the death of Arthur Peacock. Labour retained Wandsworth on 15 June 1972 after the death of Sir Norman Prichard. No seats were vacant at the end of the term.

References

1970 in London
1970 English local elections
1970
April 1970 events in the United Kingdom